Jubail Airport (Arabic: مطار الجبيل Matar al-Jubayl) is an airfield  west of Jubail City in the Eastern Province of Saudi Arabia. The airport occupies an area of about 20 km2.

Overview 
Originally constructed by the Royal Commission of Jubail and Yanbu as part of Jubail project, it was meant to be used for commercial aviation until it was decided to utilize the large nearby King Fahd International Airport. Thus, it was handed over to the Ministry of Defence and has been used as a base for the naval aviation group/eastern fleet of the Royal Saudi Navy since then.

However it was recently announced that the airport will be opened for private aviation operations starting September 2014, therefore a project to renovate the airfield was undertaken since some of the airfield's infrastructure was incomplete as a result of the previous change for the use of airport from commercial to military.

Facilities
There is one runway, 4,000 meters long and 45 meters wide. The taxiways however was not completed until recently after announcing the plans of using the airport for private aviation in addition to the current military use.

Recent activities
Due to the accelerating development in Jubail Industrial City and other nearby industrial complexes such as Khurisaniyah and Ras Al-Khair, the airport was handed over to the General Authority of Civil Aviation and will be operated as a civil airport starting from September 2014.

References

Jubail
Airports in Saudi Arabia